Swami Records is a San Diego-based independent record label specializing in punk rock and rock music. The label was founded in 2000 by John Reis, who also has his own radio show, Swami Sound System, on station 94.9FM KBZT in San Diego.

Releases

External links
 Official site
 

Record labels established in 2000
American independent record labels
Punk record labels
Post-hardcore record labels
Rock and roll record labels
Garage rock record labels